Cēre parish is an administrative unit of Tukums Municipality, Latvia.

See also 
 Cēre Manor

References 

 

Parishes of Latvia
Tukums Municipality
Courland